The siege of Lazarevsky took place during the Russo-Circassian War on the night of February 7, 1840. After a 3-hour battle, the fortification was taken by the Circassians. The fort was then destroyed by Circassians, who did not want hostile elements in their land.

History

Siege 
Lazarevsky Fort was built in 1839 on the eastern coast of the Black Sea at the mouth of the Psezuapse River. In December 1839, Circassian spy Musa Shogen penetrated the Russian fortress of Lazarevsk, claiming to be fleeing from feuds. He remained in the fortification for three months and informed the Circassians outside, who were waiting to hear from him, about the situation in the enemy camp, the number of soldiers and weapons in the fortress.

The garrison of the Lazarevsky Fort consisted of the 4th Musketeer Company of the Tenginsky Infantry Regiment and a team of Cossacks of the Azov Cossack Host. Also in the fortification were 8 different types of naval guns and defence weapons. On the night of February 7, 1840, Musa Shogen sneaked out of the fort and returned to his own community. At dawn, he guided the Circassian army to the doors of the castle. After a 3-hour battle, the fortification was taken by the Circassians. The fort was then destroyed by Circassians, who did not want hostile elements in their land.

Result 
The commander of the 4th Musketeer Company of the Tenginsky Infantry Regiment, Captain Marchenko, was the military commander of the Lazarevsky Fort at the time. He was criticized for showing a humiliating performance in the defence of the fort.

After this victory, however, Circassians were not pleased. Expecting genocidal revenge from the Russians, the Circassians of the nearby villages from the early morning of May 23 began to pack their things and move to the mountains. On May 28, a large Russian detachment headed for the mountains and completely massacred 12 Circassian villages, after which the Circassians of other villages fled further into the mountains.

References 

Lazarevsky
Lazarevsky